Candi & The Backbeat (initially named Candi) was a Canadian pop band fronted by lead vocalist Candita "Candy" Pennella. Band members included Nino (Big Papa) Milazzo (bass and background vocals), Paul (Baldy) Russo (drums and percussion), and Rich Imbrogno (keyboards). The band is best known among U.S. audiences for the freestyle classic "Dancing Under a Latin Moon", a major dance hit which also made number 68 on the Billboard Hot 100 in 1988.

History
Originally an Italian wedding band, Candi released their debut self-titled album Candi in 1988 on the I.R.S. Records label. Their self-titled debut included "Dancing Under a Latin Moon" and "Under Your Spell."  The latter was nominated for Single of the Year at the 1990 Juno Awards. Candi'''s "Under Your Spell" and "Missing You" were both nominated for Best Dance Recording at the same award show. Pennella was also nominated for Female Vocalist of the Year, losing to Rita MacNeil. Pennella was nominated for the same award the following year, losing to Celine Dion.

The band, renamed Candi & The Backbeat, released the album World Keeps on Turning in 1990.  The title track from the album was nominated for the Best Dance Recording at the 1991 Juno Awards.

After promotion of this album, they decided not to continue with the project. Candy ended up marrying her drummer, and currently teaches high school in the Toronto area.

Discography
Studio albums
 Candi (1988)
 World Keeps on Turning'' (1990)

Singles

References

Canadian dance music groups
Canadian pop music groups
Musical groups established in 1988
Musical groups disestablished in 1991
Musical groups from Toronto
North York
1988 establishments in Ontario
1991 disestablishments in Ontario